Zhao Lei may refer to:

 Zhao Lei (Three Kingdoms) (died 220), military officer serving under the warlord Liu Bei
 Zhao Lei (actor) (1928–1996), Chinese actor
 Zhao Lei (singer) (born 1986), Chinese folk singer and musician